The Dr. Richard and Mrs. Margaret Martin House is a historic house in Nashville, Tennessee, U.S.. It was built in 1956 for Dr. Richard Martin and his wife, Margaret. It was designed by architect Robert Bruce Draper. It has been listed on the National Register of Historic Places since March 22, 2007.

References

External links

Houses on the National Register of Historic Places in Tennessee
Houses completed in 1956
Houses in Nashville, Tennessee